Marc-Konstantin Steifensand (born 14 May 1966) is a German fencer. He competed in the individual and team épée events at the 2000 Summer Olympics.

References

External links
 

1966 births
Living people
German male fencers
Olympic fencers of Germany
Fencers at the 2000 Summer Olympics
Sportspeople from Wuppertal